Džuboks (trans. Jukebox) was a Yugoslav music magazine. Launched in 1966, it was the very first magazine in SFR Yugoslavia dedicated predominantly to rock music and the first rock music magazine to be published in a communist country.

History

Launch

Džuboks was launched during spring 1966 by the Belgrade-based Duga publishing company in the aftermath of the three-day Gitarijada music festival, whose large attendance and euphoric atmosphere several months earlier at the Belgrade Fair were indicative of the rising popularity of rock music locally. The idea for a monthly rock music magazine came from Duga staff journalists who had already been putting together a weekly film magazine, Filmski svet (Film World), feeling an entirly new publication catering to the growing number of rock music fans in Yugoslavia could prove successful. As Duga had no rock music writers or reviewers among its staff, they reached out to Nikola Karaklajić—local radio personality in his early forties who had already been involved with rock music in Belgrade in organizational and promotional capacity—with an offer of becoming the Džuboks''' editor-in-chief. Karaklajić—who in addition to his Radio Belgrade job also pursued chess professionally, becoming the national champion and member of the Yugoslav national chess team—accepted the offer and set about creating a rock magazine.

Although not the very first popular music magazine to be published in Yugoslavia (it was preceded by the jazz and popular music magazine Ritam),Rakezić, Saša, "Rok muzika u Vojvodini: Duh urbanih ravničara", vreme.com Džuboks was the first magazine dedicated specifically to rock music in Yugoslavia as well as in a post-World War II socialist state. 
{{Quote box |quoted=true |bgcolor=#FFFFF0 |salign=right|quote=Due to being able to get my hands on foreign [English language] music magazines, I picked up the tricks used by NME, Melody Maker, etc. And we put together a magazine that ended up reaching a circulation of 100,000 copies, each issue flying off the newsstands within three days of appearing.|source={{small|-Džuboks original editor-in-chief Nikola Karaklajić on his approach to editing a music magazine.}}|align=right|width=33%}}

The first issue came out on 3 May 1966. There was a huge discussion among the editorial staff whether the Beatles or the Rolling Stones should appear on the cover of the first issue, and the opinion favouring the Rolling Stones prevailed.

1966—1969
Initial Džuboks issues were published with the "Filmski svet'''s special supplement" inscription printed at the bottom of each cover, which would soon be dropped. The magazine received no negative reactions from the ruling Yugoslav Communist League (SKJ), though it did from conservative cultural circles. According to Karaklajić, there was no political interference into the editorial policy. Karaklajić further stated that the only political interference occurred after the magazine's launch via an SKJ representative asking for a meeting with the editors to "see what was going on and to advise us to be cautious, so as not to be regarded as someone's agency".

In December 1966, following the 9th issue, Karaklajić left the editor-in-chief post and was replaced with Sava Popović whose first issue came out in February 1967.

Višnja Marjanović, Džuboks editor-in-chief from February until June 1969, talked about the magazine during her appearance in the Rockovnik documentary series:

Historian Radina Vučetić, in her book Koka-kola socijalizam (Coca-Cola Socialism), wrote:

The magazine's circulation was 100,000 copies. In comparison, the circulation of all youth magazines published by Yugoslav university organizations (for about 150,000 university students Yugoslavia had at the time) was about 80,000. Džuboks published the top list of Yugoslav hit singles. The magazine also published top lists from the United States, United Kingdom, France and Italy, later joined by Dutch, Belgian, Norwegian and Brazilian top lists, and on several occasions the magazine published top lists from the Philippines and Singapore. During the first three years of the magazine's run, posters of foreign and domestic stars as well as flexi discs featuring international rock hits of the day were often distributed with the magazine. The discs were published in cooperation with the Jugoton record label, which at the time had a licence contract with EMI. The magazine also advertised Western radio stations (publishing their frequencies and program) and music magazines (publishing information about ways of ordering them).

After the 39th issue, released in June 1969, Duga stopped publishing the magazine.

Mini Džuboks
During spring 1968, Duga launched Mini Džuboks, which, beside music, covered other aspects of the entertainment industry, including fashion. Its first editor-in-chief was Sava Popović, and was succeeded by Višnja Marjanović. The first issue of Mini Džuboks was released on 9 May 1968. After the 33rd issue, released on 20 February 1969, Mini Džuboks was discontinued.

Second incarnation: 1974—1986

Ladin Džuboks (1974-1976)
In the summer of 1974, more than five years since the magazine's demise, the Dečje novine publishing company from Gornji Milanovac renewed Džuboks under the Ladin Džuboks (Lada's Džuboks) name as a supplement to the Lada women's magazine. Though the publisher was based in Gornji Milanovac, the magazine's newsroom was in Belgrade. The renewed publication's first issue appeared on 1 July 1974 featuring established film and television star Milena Dravić and rising pop star Zdravko Čolić on the cover. Now published under the Jugoslovenski muzički magazin (Yugoslav Music Magazine) slogan, the publication expanded its scope beyond just rock music, so that musical genres such as pop, jazz, and classical music also began to be covered. Additionally, adjacent artistic endeavours that fall under the category of film, photography, comics, and literature also found coverage.

Standalone publication (1976-1986)
By August 1976, the magazine appeared as an independent publication outside of Lada under just the Džuboks name. The first editor-in-chief was Vojkan Borisavljević, and he was followed by Milisav Ćirović, Peca Popović and Branko Vukojević. The first issue was released on 1 July 1974, and the last, 171st, on 22 July 1983.

In late 1983, Džuboks resumed publishing once again, this time run by editor-in-chief Ljuba Trifunović. It was discontinued in 1986.

Journalists and contributors
Some of the journalists and contributors to Džuboks during its activity include:

 Miroslav Begović
 Slobodan Cicmil
 Miroslav Ćirović
 Rajko Dvizac
 Bora Đorđević
 Zlatko Gall
 
 Vladan Jovanović
 Biljana Maksić
 Goran Marić
 Milomir Marić
 
 
 Petar Jakonić
 Petar Janjatović
 Dušan Kojić
 Slobodan Konjović
 Dragan Kremer
 Marko Lopušina
 Aleksandar Žikić
 
 Nebojša Pajkić
 
 Predrag Popović
 Momčilo Rajin
 
 Brian Rašić
 Saša Strižak
 Gordan Škondrić
 Ljuba Trifunović
 Slobodan Trbojević
 
 
 Radovan Vujović
 
 Ljubinko Živković
 Mladen Vukmir

Džuboks internet archive
In 2004, the online magazine Popboks was founded, containing a digitalized archive of Džuboks issues released between 1974 and 1985.

Legacy
In her book Koka-kola socijalizam Radina Vučetić wrote:

In 2017, Serbian news magazine Nedeljnik proclaimed the 1974 renewed publishing of Džuboks one of 100 Events that Changed Serbia.

References

External links
 Džuboks archive at Popboks.com

Music magazines published in Serbia
Serbian rock music
Yugoslav rock music
Serbian-language magazines
Defunct magazines published in Yugoslavia
Monthly magazines
Magazines established in 1966
Magazines disestablished in 1985
1966 establishments in Yugoslavia